Prtovč (in older sources also Prtovič) is a settlement in the Municipality of Železniki in the Upper Carniola region of Slovenia.

The church in the settlement is dedicated to the Virgin Mary and was built in 1869 by extending an older chapel.

References

External links

Prtovč at Geopedia

Populated places in the Municipality of Železniki